The national symbols of Azerbaijan are official and unofficial flags, icons or cultural expressions that are emblematic, representative or otherwise characteristic of Azerbaijan and of its culture.

Official symbols

Unofficial symbols

References

External links 
 The National Symbols of the Republic of Azerbaijan